Jill Jones is the self-titled debut solo album from the artist of the same name; Jill Jones. The album was released in 1987 on Paisley Park / Warner Bros. Records. It was produced by Jones and Prince.

Her debut was warmly received in Europe, but failed to chart in the U.S. on the Billboard Top 100 Pop, Black, or Dance charts.  None of the three released singles managed to enter any of the Top 100 charts. Warner Bros. Records never pushed the album.

Background

In 1983, Jones moved to Minneapolis to begin work on her solo album. Prince spent three years working with his "protégé". Prince wrote and performed much of the music on the album while Jones supplied the lyrics. David Z. did a large portion of the audio engineering and music production (without Prince) at Electric Lady Studios in New York City.  

In the book Prince and the Parade & Sign O' The Times Era Sessions, Jones was quoted as saying she and David Z had a lot of latitude when it came to their sound.  "I think Prince also trusted me to go my way, because once Miles Davis actually gave it the stamp of approval.  We played it for him, and it was kind of finished once Miles heard it technically.  Prince told me, 'Miles loves you, he just loves you.'" 

Lead single "Mia Bocca" became a top 10 hit in Italy in July 1987, peaking at #6. Further single releases "G-Spot" and "For Love" failed to chart.

Prince authored two songs on the album: "With You” and "Baby, You're a Trip,” which was originally attributed to Jones.  Two other songs written by Prince, "77 Bleeker St."  and  "Baby Cries (Ay Yah)", were issued as B-sides. Billy Idol guitarist Steve Stevens, who was a close friend of Jones, contributed to three tracks on the album.

The album is out of print.

Track listing

All songs composed by Jill Jones and Prince; except where indicated.

Side 1 

The music for "Mia Bocca" was heard in Prince's 1986 movie Under the Cherry Moon
"G-Spot" was originally recorded by Prince & the Revolution in 1983, and was intended for a scene in Purple Rain along with "Electric Intercourse," but was replaced by "The Beautiful Ones"
"With You" was record by Prince on his 1979 album Prince

Side 2 

 the Family: a Prince protégé band that record 1 album in 1985. St Paul Peterson (keyboards), Jellybean Johnson (drums-also drummer for the Time band), Eric Leeds (saxophone) and possibly with other extended Family band members like: Miko Weaver (guitar), Jonathon Melvoin (keyboards) etc.
 the Revolution: Prince (guitar), Bobby Z (drums), Dr Fink (keyboards), Lisa Coleman (keyboards), Brown Mark (bass), Wendy Melvoin (guitar). The song was originally recorded live at First Avenue in June 1984 with Prince on lead vocals.

Album 12" Singles

References

External links
Billboard.com - Jill Jones Music News & Info. Clifford, Paul
[ Billboard.com - Album; Jill Jones]
Vicars, J. J. "Jill Jones: A Promise Fulfilled." Welcome to Facebook. Web. 17 July 2010

1987 debut albums
Jill Jones albums
Albums produced by Prince (musician)
Paisley Park Records albums
Warner Records albums
Albums recorded at Electric Lady Studios
Albums recorded at Sunset Sound Recorders